Noël Godin (born 13 September 1945) is a Belgian writer, critic, actor and notorious pie thrower or entarteur. Godin gained global attention in 1998 when his group ambushed Microsoft CEO Bill Gates in Brussels, pelting the software magnate with a pie. After bombarding Gates, Godin allegedly said, "My work is done here."

Philosophy 

Godin insists he is non-violent and is careful to use only what he calls a "tarte classique", filled with whipped cream and perhaps a little chocolate in soft sponge cake. He says his humor can be traced back through Jerry Lewis, Wile E. Coyote, the Marx Brothers and yippies like Abbie Hoffman.

Godin is inspired (for instance in his Anthologie de la subversion carabinée (1989)) by the works of the Utopian philosophers Tommaso Campanella (Civitas Solis) and Charles Fourier (La Phalange, Le Phalanstère).
His ideal society is one where there is no struggle for power or money and where everybody can live in a state of perfect happiness.
He is also an admirer of the anarchist Ravachol without approving his violence, sentiment which inspired him to his pie-attacks.

Godin has a particularly colourful way of expressing himself, using terms like "tempêtes patissières" (pastry storm) to describe his pieing.

Selected victims 
The list of public figures Godin and his accomplices have targeted with pies includes:

 Marguerite Duras (1969)
 Maurice Béjart (1969)
 Marco Ferreri (1976)
 Jean-Luc Godard (1985)
 Bernard-Henri Lévy (1985, 1988, 1991, 1994, 1995, 2000, 2015)
 Jean Delannoy (1988)
 Vladimir Volkoff (1993)
 Patrick Bruel (1993)
 Jean-Pierre Elkabbach (1994)
 Hélène Rollès (1995)
 Philippe Douste-Blazy (1995)
 Pascal Sevran (1995)

 Patrick Poivre d'Arvor (1996)
 Daniel Toscan du Plantier (1996)
 Priests at Nantes Cathedral (1996)
 Nicolas Sarkozy (1997)
 Bill Gates (1998)
 Bernard Landry (2000)
 Benjamin Castaldi (2001)
 Jean-Pierre Chevènement (2002)
 Karel Dillen and Jean-Claude Martinez (2002)
 Jean Charest (2003)
 Doc Gynéco (2007)

Books 
 Anthologie de la subversion carabinée, L'âge d'homme, 1989,  (philosophical study of political freedom), réédition revue et augmentée, 2008
 Zig zig boum boum, Le Veilleur, Toulouse, 1994
 Crème et châtiment : mémoire d'un entarteur, Albin Michel, 1995
 Godin par Godin, Yellow Now, 2001, 
 Armons-nous les uns les autres! (novel), Flammarion, 2003, 
 Entartons, entartons les pompeux cornichons!, Flammarion, 2005,  (The story of all his pieings).

References

External links

Piers' websites
Official Site of the "Internationale Pâtissière" (IP)
Official Site of the Montreal "entartistes"

Articles

An article about Godin

Movies with Noël Godin 
Site of the Movies with Noel Godin
Les vacances de Noël (2005)
La vie politique des Belges (2002)
Camping Cosmos (1998)
La vie sexuelle des Belges 1950-78 (1994)

1945 births
Living people
Belgian male actors
Belgian non-fiction writers
Belgian male writers
Belgian film directors
Belgian anarchists
Bill Gates
Walloon people
Writers from Liège
Film people from Liège
Male non-fiction writers